Pipe(s), PIPE(S) or piping may refer to:

Objects
 Pipe (fluid conveyance), a hollow cylinder following certain dimension rules
 Piping, the use of pipes in industry
 Smoking pipe
 Tobacco pipe
 Half-pipe and quarter pipe, semi-circular ramps for performing skateboarding/snowboarding tricks
 Piping (sewing), tubular ornamental fabric sewn around the edge of a garment
 For the musical instruments, see below

Music
 Pipe (instrument), a traditional perforated wind instrument
 Bagpipe, a class of musical instrument, aerophones using enclosed reeds
 Pipes and drums or pipe bands, composed of musicians who play the Scottish and Irish bagpipes
 Organ pipe, one of the tuned resonators that produces the main sound of a pipe organ
 Pan pipes, see Pan flute, an ancient musical instrument based on the principle of the stopped pipe
 Piped music, or elevator music, a type of background music
 "Pipe", by Christie Front Drive from Christie Front Drive, 1994

Computing
 Pipeline (Unix)
 Anonymous pipe and named pipe, a one-way communication channel used for inter-process communication
 "PHY Interface for PCI Express" (PIPE), the name of a specification for the PCI Express physical layer
 Yahoo! Pipes
sspipes.scr, a screensaver for Microsoft Windows
 PIPE Networks, an Australian company primarily involved in setting up peering exchanges

Technology
 Pipe (casting), a type of metal-casting defect
 Boatswain's pipe, an instrument used for signalling or to issue commands on a warship
 PIPES, a common buffer used in chemistry and biology laboratory work
 Pipe (car), a Belgian automobile manufacturer

Places
 Pipe, Wisconsin, United States
 Pipe, the Hungarian name for Pipea village, Nadeș Commune, Mureș County, Romania

People
 Jules Pipe CBE, Mayor of the London Borough of Hackney, UK
 Pipes (surname)

Other uses
 Vertical bar, sometimes called "pipe", the character 
 Pipe (letter), the IPA letter for a dental click
 Pipe (unit) or butt, a cask measurement for wine barrels
 Volcanic pipe, a deep, narrow cone of solidified magma
 PIPE deal or private investment in public equity
 Pipes, a slang term for arm muscles
The Pipes, a 1966 Czech film
 "Pipes", an episode of The Good Doctor

See also 
 Pipeline (disambiguation)
 Piper (disambiguation)
 Pipette, used in chemistry and biology laboratory work

 Piping bags or pastry bags, in cooking, are used to pipe semi-solid foods onto other foods (e.g., icing on a cake)
 Postpipe, archaeological remains of a timber in a posthole